Derek Funderburk Jr. (born April 12, 1997) is an American professional basketball player for Hapoel Eilat of the Israeli Basketball Premier League. He played college basketball for the Northwest Florida State Raiders and the NC State Wolfpack. He has also participated in the NBA Summer League with the Utah Jazz.

High school career
Funderburk attended St. Edward High School. As a junior, he averaged 14.2 points and 6.7 rebounds per game to help lead St. Edwards to the 2015 Division I State Final Four. He transferred to Hargrave Military Academy for his senior season, playing under coach A. W. Hamilton and alongside future NC State teammate Braxton Beverly. Funderburk averaged 18 points, nine rebounds and three assists per game and helped the Tigers to a Prep School National Championship and a 47–1 record. Funderburk was ranked the No. 77 overall recruit in the class of 2016. He committed to Ohio State.

College career
Funderburk redshirted his freshman season at Ohio State. He transferred to Northwest Florida State College and averaged 11.5 points, 5.0 rebounds and 1.7 assists per game as a redshirt freshman, shooting 51.1 percent from the field. Funderburk transferred to NC State. Funderburk averaged 8.8 points and 4.2 rebounds per game as a redshirt sophomore. He was suspended for violating team policy in September 2019. Funderburk was charged with larceny property damage by university police after driving off with two car boots, damaging the boots and the concrete surface in the parking lot. On December 29, 2019, he scored a career-high 22 points in a 72–60 win against Appalachian State. As a redshirt junior, Funderburk averaged 12.8 points and 6.1 rebounds per game. Following the season, he declared for the 2020 NBA draft, but ultimately opted to return to NC State. Funderburk missed a game against Syracuse on January 31, 2021, due to a violation of university policy. As a senior, he averaged 12.6 points and 5.6 rebounds per game. Following the season, Funderburk declared for the 2021 NBA draft and signed with an agent, forgoing the additional season of eligibility the NCAA granted due to the COVID-19 pandemic.

Professional career
After going undrafted in the 2021 NBA draft, Funderburk signed with the Utah Jazz for Summer League play. 

On August 27, 2021, Funderburk signed his first professional contract with the Russian team Avtodor of the VTB United League. He left the team after the 2022 Russian invasion of Ukraine. Funderburk averaged 10.7 points and 2.6 rebounds per game. On March 16, 2022, Funderburk signed with Paris Basketball of the LNB Pro A for the rest of the season.

On July 12, 2022, Funderburk signed with Promitheas Patras of the Greek Basket League and the EuroCup. On September 3, 2022, Funderburk mutually parted ways with the Greek club without appearing in a single official game with the team. On the same day, he signed with Reggio Emilia of the Italian Lega Basket Serie A (LBA).

On November 14, 2022, he signed with Hapoel Eilat of the Israeli Basketball Premier League.

Career statistics

College

NCAA Division I

|-
| style="text-align:left;"| 2016–17
| style="text-align:left;"| Ohio State
| style="text-align:center;" colspan="11"|  Redshirt
|-
| style="text-align:left;"| 2018–19
| style="text-align:left;"| NC State
| 36 || 1 || 19.9 || .552 || .269 || .785 || 4.2 || .4 || .5 || 1.1 || 8.8
|-
| style="text-align:left;"| 2019–20
| style="text-align:left;"| NC State
| 30 || 15 || 26.0 || .609 || .222 || .760 || 6.1 || .3 || .9 || .8 || 12.8
|-
| style="text-align:left;"| 2020–21
| style="text-align:left;"| NC State
| 21 || 13 || 26.2 || .562 || .200 || .792 || 5.6 || .3 || .7 || .5 || 12.6
|- class="sortbottom"
| style="text-align:center;" colspan="2"| Career
| 87 || 29 || 23.5 || .577 || .237 || .778 || 5.2 || .4 || .7 || .8 || 11.1

JUCO

|-
| style="text-align:left;"| 2017–18
| style="text-align:left;"| Northwest Florida State
| 34 || 33 || 27.5 || .511 || .279 || .743 || 5.0 || 1.7 || 1.2 || .5 || 11.5

References

External links
NC State Wolfpack bio
Northwest Florida State Raiders bio

1997 births
Living people
American men's basketball players
American expatriate basketball people in France
American expatriate basketball people in Russia
Basketball players from Ohio
BC Avtodor Saratov players
Centers (basketball)
Hapoel Eilat basketball players
NC State Wolfpack men's basketball players
Northwest Florida State Raiders men's basketball players
Pallacanestro Reggiana players
Paris Basketball players
Power forwards (basketball)
Sportspeople from Lakewood, Ohio